Siphonochelus is a genus of sea snails, marine gastropod mollusks in the family Muricidae, the murex snails or rock snails.

It was first described by Félix Pierre Jousseaume in 1880.

Species
Species within the genus Siphonochelus include:
 Siphonochelus aethomorpha Houart & Héros, 2015
 Siphonochelus angustus Houart, 1991
 Siphonochelus arcuatus (Hinds, 1843)
 Siphonochelus boucheti Houart, 1991
 † Siphonochelus fistulosus (Brocchi, 1814) 
 Siphonochelus generosus Iredale, 1936
 Siphonochelus hasegawai Houart, Buge & Zuccon, 2021
 Siphonochelus japonicus (A. Adams, 1863)
 Siphonochelus mozambicus Houart, 2017
 Siphonochelus nipponensis Keen & Campbell, 1964
 Siphonochelus pentaphasios (Barnard, 1959)
 Siphonochelus radwini Emerson & D'Attilio, 1979
 Siphonochelus riosi (Bertsch & D'Attilio, 1980)
 Siphonochelus rosadoi Houart, 1999
 Siphonochelus solus Vella, 1961
 Siphonochelus stillacandidus Houart, 1985
 Siphonochelus syringianus (Hedley, 1903)
 Siphonochelus transcurrens (Martens, 1902)

 Brought into synonymy 
 Siphonochelus (Laevityphis) Cossmann, 1903: synonym of Laevityphis Cossmann, 1903
 Siphonochelus (Trubatsa) Dall, 1889 : synonym of Trubatsa Dall, 1889
 Siphonochelus erythrostigma Keen & Campbell, 1964: synonym of Choreotyphis erythrostigma (Keen & Campbell, 1964) (original combination)
 Siphonochelus longicornis (Dall, 1888): synonym of Trubatsa lozoueti'' (Houart, 1991)
 Siphonochelus lozoueti Houart, 1991: synonym of Trubatsa lozoueti (Houart, 1991)
 Siphonochelus pavlova (Iredale, 1936): synonym of Choreotyphis pavlova (Iredale, 1936)
 Siphonochelus saltantis Houart, 1991: synonym of Trubatsa saltantis (Houart, 1991)
 Siphonochelus tityrus (Bayer, 1971): synonym of Trubatsa tityrus (Bayer, 1971)
 Siphonochelus undulatus Houart, 1991: synonym of Trubatsa undulata'' (Houart, 1991)
 Siphonochelus unicornis Houart, 1991: synonym of Trubatsa unicornis (Houart, 1991)
 Siphonochelus virginiae (Houart, 1986): synonym of Trubatsa virginiae (Houart, 1986)
 Siphonochelus wolffi Houart, 2013: synonym of Trubatsa wolffi (Houart, 2013) (original combination)

References

 
Gastropod genera
Gastropods described in 1880
Taxa named by Félix Pierre Jousseaume